Karol G is a Colombian singer and songwriter. She has received several awards and nominations including two Latin Grammy Awards, two Billboard Music Awards, two MTV Europe Music Awards, one American Music Award and ten Premios Lo Nuestro, among others.

In 2017, she released her first studio album titled Unstoppable, the following year she won the Latin Grammy Award for Best New Artist. Her second album Ocean was released in 2019, the same year she participated in the song "China" alongside reggaeton singers Anuel AA, Daddy Yankee, Ozuna and J Balvin, the song was commercially successful and was nominated for two Latin Grammy Awards, for Record of the Year and Best Urban Fusion/Performance.

Also in 2019, she released the song "Tusa" featuring rapper Nicki Minaj, the song was highly successful and received two Latin Grammy nominations, including Song of the Year, it also won three Latin American Music Awards and was nominated for five Billboard Latin Music Awards and two MTV Video Music Awards.

In 2021, she released her third album, KG0516, the album was nominated for the Grammy Award for Best Música Urbana Album, being her first Grammy Award nomination, it also won a Billboard Music Award and two Latin American Music Awards. The album includes the single "Bichota", which won the Latin Grammy Award for Best Reggaeton Performance in 2021, being her second Latin Grammy win.

During 2022, she released two commercially successful singles, "Mamiii" featuring Becky G, which got five nominations at the 2022 Billboard Latin Music Awards, and "Provenza", which received nominations for both Song of the Year and Record of the Year at the 23rd Annual Latin Grammy Awards.

Awards and nominations

References

Lists of awards received by Colombian musician